Radio News could refer to:

Entertainment
The radio news format, a radio format, also known as news/talk.
Radio News Magazine.